This is a list of wars involving Abkhazia since its de facto independence in 1993.

List

References

History of Abkhazia
Abkhazia
Wars